Tengrisaurus (meaning "Tengri lizard") is a  genus of lithostrotian sauropod, from the Early Cretaceous (Barremian-Aptian) Murtoi Formation, Russia. It was described in 2017 by Averianov & Skutschas.  The type species is T. starkovi.  New remains were described in 2021 by Averianov, Sizov & Skutschas.

Description 
Tengrisaurus starkovi is  based on three caudal vertebrae. The genus is characterized by strongly procoelous anterior and middle caudal vertebrae, with strongly developed pre-epipophyses, highly pneumatic neural spine, and solid bone structure of the centrum.

Classification 
Amerianov and Efimov (2018) recovered Tengrisaurus as a lithostrotian titanosaur. They found Lithostrotia to be divided into two main lineages, one containing Saltasauridae, the other containing Lognkosauria, with Tengrisaurus belonging to the former. The following cladogram follows their analysis.

References 

Titanosaurs
Aptian life
Barremian life
Late Cretaceous dinosaurs of Asia
Cretaceous Russia
Fossils of Russia
Fossil taxa described in 2017